Peyman Babaei (born 14 December 1994) is an Iranian professional footballer who plays for Esteghlal in the Persian Gulf Pro League.

Club career
Babaei was banned two years for doping between December 2014 and December 2016.

On 16 January 2019, Babaei signed for Sumgayit FK on loan from Machine Sazi on a 18–month loan deal.

Club career statistics
Last Update: 3 September 2019

Honours 
Sumgayit FK
Azerbaijan Premier League Top Goalscorer (1): 2019–20
Esteghlal
Iranian Super Cup:  2022

References

External links
 

 Peyman Babaei in IRIFF
Peyman Babaei at football.net 
Peyman Babaei  Fotmob
Peyman Babaei   at PersianLeague.com

1994 births
Living people
Sportspeople from Tabriz
Iranian footballers
Persian Gulf Pro League players
Azerbaijan Premier League players
Tractor S.C. players
Gostaresh Foulad F.C. players
Machine Sazi F.C. players
Sumgayit FK players
Esteghlal F.C. players
Iranian sportspeople in doping cases
Association football forwards
Iranian expatriate footballers
Iranian expatriate sportspeople in Azerbaijan
Expatriate footballers in Azerbaijan